Khao Suan Kwang is a district (amphoe) of Khon Kaen province, northeastern Thailand.

History
The minor district (king amphoe) Khao Suan Kwang was established in 1978 by splitting it from Nam Phong district. It was upgraded to a full district on 16 March 1985.

Geography
Neighboring districts are (from the south clockwise): Nam Phong and Ubolratana of Khon Kaen Province; Non Sang of Nong Bua Lamphu province; Nong Wua So, Nong Saeng, and Non Sa-at of Udon Thani province.

Administration
The district is divided into five subdistricts (tambons), which are further subdivided into 56 villages (mubans). Khao Suan Kwang is a township (thesaban tambon) which covers parts of tambons Khao Suan Kwang and Kham Muang. There are a further five tambon administrative organizations (TAO).

References

External links

https://web.archive.org/web/20071026202002/http://cddweb.cdd.go.th/khaosuankwang/ (Thai)
amphoe.com

Khao Suan Kwang